Elie Farah (27 December 1909 in Kafar Berhem, Lebanon – 22 July 2003) was Archbishop of the Maronite Catholic Archeparchy of Cyprus from 1954 to 1986.

Life

Elie Farah received on April 9, 1935 the sacrament of ordination to the priesthood. On 16 April 1954 he was appointed by Pope Pius XII Archbishop of the Maronite Archeparchy of Cyprus with headquarters in Nicosia. His episcopal ordination occurred on September 26, 1954, by the former Archbishop of Tyre and future Patriarch of Antioch of the Maronites Paul Peter Meouchi on 26 September 1954 and his co-consecrators were Eparch of Cairo Pietro Dib and the Archeparch of Beirut Ignace Ziadé. Farah attended the sessions one, three and four of the Second Vatican Council. On 4 April 1986 his age-related resignation was accepted by Pope John Paul II.

Bishop Elie Farah died on 22 July 2003.

See also
Catholic Church in Cyprus

References

External links
 Bishop Farahe 

1909 births
2003 deaths
Lebanese clergy
20th-century Maronite Catholic bishops